Lalon Band is a Bengali folk, rock and fusion music band origin  from Khulna, Bangladesh. The band was formed in Khulna in 2001 and mostly influenced by Fakir Lalon Shai.

History
Nigar Sultana Sumi established the band on 2001 in greater Khulna. She is the founder and main vocalist of the band. The band first Album Biprotip was released in 2007. After two years later their second album Khepa was released.

Discography
 Biprotip – 2007
 Khepa – 2009
 B protip - 2012
 Pagol – 2012
 Sada Kalo - 2013
 Baul Of Bengal - 2014
 A Tribute to Fakir Lalon Sai – 2015

Band members

Current members
 Nigar Sultana Sumi – Vocal, Founder of Band (2001–present)  
 Titi – Drums (2007–present)
 Ashraf Ahmed Turjo (Bass) (2011–present) 
 Rafi Islam (Guitar), (2014–present)
 Julkar Naim Ratul (Guitar) (2014–present)
 Clinton Prottoy - Keyboard (2018–present)

Former members
 Ahasanur Rahman Ashiq - drums, songwriter, co-founder of band (2001-2007)
 Meer Masum - keyboard, (2001-2007)
 Masum Wahidur Rahman – lead guitars, backing vocals, (2001–2011)
 Sentu - Bass 2007-2011
 Limon - Lead Guitars (2007-2011)
 Iftekhar Hasan Bappy - lead guitars, backing vocals, Songwriter, (2011-2014)
 Shaik Salekin - lead guitars (2011-2013)
 Imran - lead guitars 2013-2014
 Jewel - guitars
 Sohel - bass
 Rasel - Keyboard

References

External links
 Official website

Bangladeshi alternative rock groups
Bangladeshi rock music groups
Bangladeshi folk music groups